Pale lager is a very pale-to-golden-colored lager beer with a well-attenuated body and a varying degree of noble hop bitterness.

The brewing process for this beer developed in the mid-19th century, when Gabriel Sedlmayr took pale ale brewing and malt making techniques back to the Spaten Brewery in Germany and applied them to existing lagering methods, resulting in a less dark, red-colored beer. This technique was applied by Josef Groll, the famous Bavarian brewmaster, hired by Měšťanský pivovar in the city of Pilsen, Bohemia, Austria-Hungary (now Czech Republic) with local ingredients, resulting in the first pale lager Pilsner Urquell in 1842. 

The resulting Pilsner beers—pale-colored, lean and stable—gradually spread around the globe to become the most common form of beer consumed in the world today.

 History 

Bavarian brewers in the sixteenth century were required by law to brew beer only during the cooler months of the year. In order to have beer available during the hot summer months, beers would be stored (lagered) in caves and stone cellars, often under blocks of ice.

In the period 1820–1830, a brewer named Gabriel Sedlmayr II the Younger, whose family was running the Spaten Brewery in Bavaria, went around Europe to improve his brewing skills. When he returned, he used what he had learned to get a more stable and consistent lager beer. The Bavarian lager was still different from the widely known modern lager; due to the use of dark malts it was quite dark, representing what is now called Dunkel beer or the stronger variety, bock beer.

The new recipe of the improved lager beer spread quickly over Europe. In particular Sedlmayr's friend Anton Dreher adopted new kilning techniques that enabled the use of lighter malts to improve the Viennese beer in 1840–1841, creating a rich amber-red colored Vienna-style lager.

 Description 
Pale lagers tend to be dry, lean, clean-tasting and crisp. Flavors may be subtle, with no traditional beer ingredient dominating the others. Hop character (bitterness, flavor, and aroma) ranges from negligible to a dry bitterness from noble hops. The main ingredients are water, Pilsner malt and noble hops, though some brewers use adjuncts such as rice or corn to lighten the body of the beer.

Depending on style, pale lagers typically contain 4-6% alcohol by volume.

 Variations 

 Pilsner 

Pale lager was developed in the mid 19th century, when Gabriel Sedlmayr took some British pale ale brewing techniques back to the Spaten Brewery in Germany, and started to modernize continental brewing methods. In 1842 a new modern lager brewery Měšťanský pivovar was built in Pilsen, a city in western Bohemia in what is now the Czech Republic. The first known example of a golden lager Pilsner Urquell was brewed there by Josef Groll. This beer proved so successful that other breweries followed the trend, using the name Pilsner. Breweries now use the terms "lager" and "Pilsner" interchangeably, though pale lagers from the Czech Republic and Germany categorized as pilsner tend to have more evident noble hop aroma and dry finish than other pale lagers.

 Dortmunder Export 

With the success of Pilsen's golden beer, the town of Dortmund in Germany started brewing pale lager in 1873. As Dortmund was a major brewing center, and the town breweries grouped together to export the beer beyond the town, the brand name
Dortmunder Export became known. Today, breweries in Denmark, the Netherlands, and North America brew pale lagers labelled as Dortmunder Export.

 Helles 

"" or "" is a traditional German pale lager, produced chiefly in Southern Germany, particularly Munich. The German word  can be translated as "bright", "light", or "pale".

 American lager 

The earliest known brewing of pale lager in the United States was in the Old City section of Philadelphia by John Wagner in 1840 using yeast from his native Bavaria. Modern American lagers are usually made by large breweries such as Anheuser-Busch. Lightness of body is a cardinal virtue, both by design and since it allows the use of a high percentage of less expensive, light-bodied rice or corn.

 Australian lager 
Beer from XXXX, various Tooheys' brands, Victoria Bitter (which is classified as a lager), West End, Swan are Australian lagers.

 Dry beer 
"Diet" in the instance not referring to being "light" in calories or body, rather its sugars are fully fermented into alcohol, allowing the beer to be targeted to diabetics due to its lower carbohydrate content. Because the available sugars are fully fermented, dry beers often have a higher alcohol content, which may be reduced in the same manner as low-alcohol beers.

The first dry beer, Gablinger's Diet Beer, was released in 1967, developed by Joseph Owades at Rheingold Breweries in Brooklyn. Owades developed an enzyme that could further break down starches, so that the finished product contained fewer residual carbohydrates and was lower in food energy.

Prior to this change, a Diätbier could contain no more than 7.5 g of unfermented carbohydrates per liter (a typical lager contains 30-40 g/L), and the alcohol content could not exceed normal levels (5% ABV).

A marketing term for a fully attenuated pale lager, originally used in Japan by Asahi Breweries in 1987, was taken up by the American brewer Anheuser-Busch in 1988 as "dry beer" for the Michelob brand, Michelob Dry. This was followed by other "dry beer" brands such as Bud Dry, though the marketing concept was not considered a success.  In Australia, the term "Dry" substitutes for what worldwide is considered "Light": Light beers in Australia are lower alcohol, whereas Dry beers are lower in carbohydrates.

 Strong lager 
Pale lagers that exceed an abv of around 5.8% are variously termed bock, malt liquor, super strength lager, Oktoberfestbier/Märzen, or European strong lager.

 Bock 

Bock is a strong lager which has origins in the Hanseatic town of Einbeck in Germany. The name is a corruption of the medieval German brewing town of Einbeck, but also means billy goat (buck) in German. The original bocks were dark beers, brewed from high-colored malts. Modern bocks can be dark, amber or pale in color. Bock was traditionally brewed for special occasions, often religious festivals such as Christmas, Easter or Lent.

 Malt liquor 

Malt liquor is an American term referring to a strong pale lager brewed to an unnaturally high alcohol content through the addition of such high-carbohydrate adjuncts as corn, rice, and sugar. In the UK, similarly made beverages are called super-strength lager.

 Oktoberfestbier/Märzen 

Oktoberfest is a German festival dating from 1810, and Oktoberfestbiers are the beers that have been served at the festival since 1818, and are supplied by six breweries: Spaten, Löwenbräu, Augustiner-Bräu, Hofbräu-München, Paulaner and Hacker-Pschorr. Traditionally Oktoberfestbiers were the lagers of around 5.5 to 6 abv called Märzen, brewed in March and allowed to ferment slowly during the summer months. Originally these would have been dark lagers, but from 1872 a strong March brewed version of an amber-red Vienna lager made by Josef Sedlmayr became the favorite Oktoberfestbier. The color of Märzen and so Oktoberfestbier has become even lighter since the late 20th century, with all Oktoberfest beers brewed in Munich since 1990 being golden in color; though some Munich brewers still produce darker versions, mostly for export to the United States.

Oktoberfestbier is a registered trademark of the big six Munich breweries, who call themselves the Club of Munich Brewers. Oktoberfestbier is also known as Munich beer, and—along with Bavarian beer—Munich beer is protected by the European Union as a Protected Geographical Indication (PGI).

 References NotesBibliography' Fix, George J. Vienna Marzen Oktoberfest (Classic Beer Style), Brewers Publications, 1991, 
 Miller, David. Continental Pilsener (Classic Beer Style), Brewers Publications, 1990, 
 Rickman, Darryl. Bock (Classic Beer Style)'', Brewers Publications, 1994, 

Beer styles